Baton Rouge offers a wide range of educational and cultural opportunities including being the home to three major universities and colleges and a variety of public and private schools.

Public schools
The East Baton Rouge Parish Public Schools operates public schools in the city limits.

The Baton Rouge Area contains 12 public school districts-Ascension, Baker, Central Community, East Baton Rouge, East Feliciana, Iberville, Livingston, Pointe Coupee, St. Helena, West Baton Rouge, West Feliciana, and Zachary. School districts in the region provide opportunities for advanced learning through Gifted and Academic Magnet programs and tailored programs in music, visual arts, and dramatic arts. Additionally, the Capital Region is home to four of the top ten performing districts in the state.

East Baton Rouge Parish Public Schools, the city's school district, is one of the area's largest school districts. It contains approximately 90 individual schools: 56 elementary schools, 16 middle schools, and 18 high schools.

Louisiana State University operates the Louisiana State University Laboratory School, a K-12 school.  Also, Southern University operates the Southern University Laboratory School, a K-12 school.

Disability schools
The state of Louisiana directly operates two special schools for children with disabilities:
 Louisiana School for the Deaf
 Louisiana School for the Visually Impaired

High schools
Other notable High schools in the parish include:
 Baton Rouge Magnet High School
 Belaire High School
 Broadmoor High School
 Capitol High School
 Central High School
 Glen Oaks High School
 Liberty Magnet High School
 Istrouma High School
 Madison Preparatory Academy
 McKinley Senior High School 
 Tara High School
 Istrouma High School
 Scotlandville Magnet High School
 Woodlawn High School
 Zachary High School

Private schools
 Baton Rouge Christian Classical School
 Baton Rouge International School
 Catholic High School
 Christian Life Academy
 Christ Presbyterian School
 Cypress Heights Academy
 The Dunham School
 Episcopal High School
 Greater Baton Rouge Hope Academy
 Most Blessed Sacrament School
 Our Lady of Mercy School
 Parkview Baptist School
 Redemptorist High School (closed in 2015)
Runnels School
 Sacred Heart of Jesus School
 St. Aloysius School
 St. George School
 St. Jean Vianney School
 St. Joseph's Academy
 St. Jude the Apostle School
 St. Louis King of France School
 St. Luke's Episcopal Day School
 St. Michael the Archangel High School (formerly Bishop Sullivan High school)
 St. Thomas More School
 Southern University Laboratory School
 Trinity Episcopal Day School
 University Laboratory School (LSU)

Colleges and universities
Louisiana State University and Agricultural and Mechanical College, generally known as Louisiana State University or LSU, is a public, coeducational university that is the main campus of the Louisiana State University System. LSU includes nine senior colleges and three schools, in addition to specialized centers, divisions, institutes, and offices. Enrollment stands at more than 30,000 students, and there are 1,300 full-time faculty members. LSU is also one of twenty-one American universities designated as a land-grant, sea-grant and space-grant research center. LSU is the oldest public university and most comprehensive university in Louisiana.

Southern University and A&M College, generally known as Southern University, is a historically black college, founded in 1879 by P. B. S. Pinchback, T. T. Allain, and Henry Demas. Southern became a land-grant school in 1890, and an Agricultural and Mechanical department was established. The University offers programs of study ranging from an associate degree to doctoral and professional degrees. Southern University is the second oldest public university in Louisiana.

Baton Rouge Community College is an open admission, two-year post-secondary public community college, established on June 28, 1995 and settled into a permanent location in 1998. The  campus consists of five main buildings: Governors Building, Louisiana Building, Cypress Building, Bienvenue Building (student center), and the Magnolia Library Building. The college's current enrollment is more than 6,000 students. The curricular offerings include courses and programs leading to transfer credits, certificates and associate degrees.

Other colleges and universities in the Great Baton Rouge Area:
 Baton Rouge General Medical Center School of Nursing
 Baton Rouge General Medical Center School of Radiologic Technology
 ITI Technical College
 Louisiana Culinary Institute
 Louisiana Technical College (Baton Rouge campus)
Our Lady of the Lake College
 University of Phoenix (Baton Rouge campus)
 Remington College
 World Evangelism Bible College and Seminary

Libraries
The State Library of Louisiana is in Baton Rouge.

References